Parliamentary elections were held in Mauritania on 19 November, with a second round 3 December 2006. At least 28 political parties competed to comprise the lower house of parliament, the National Assembly; Islamist parties were banned, but many Islamists ran as independent candidates. 95 seats in the National Assembly were at stake in the election, along with over 200 local councils.

About 600 independent candidates ran in the election, many of whom were grouped into the National Rally of Independents (RNI). Many members of the RNI were formerly members of the Democratic and Social Republican Party, which had ruled the country under President Maaouya Ould Sid'Ahmed Taya.

Results
Before the first round's count was complete, Ahmed Ould Daddah claimed victory for his party, the Rally of Democratic Forces (RFD), saying that it was "the country's biggest political force", and claiming that the eight-party coalition including the RFD had won a majority. The Popular Alliance for Progress (APP), a party for former slaves that is also part of the coalition, and the renamed former ruling party, the Republican Party for Democracy and Renewal, were also reported to have performed well. Results from the first round confirmed a strong showing for the RFD, which won 12 out of the 43 declared seats; independent candidates also did well, taking 24 seats. For 52 seats, however, candidates did not receive majorities and these seats had to be decided in the second round.

After the second round was held on 3 December, the coalition of former opposition parties had 39 seats (including 15 for the RFD), with an additional two seats for independents supporting the coalition. Independents won 41 seats, 39 of which were part of the RNI. The former ruling party won seven seats.

17.89% of the deputies elected were female.

Messaoud Ould Boulkheir of the APP was elected as President of the National Assembly on April 26, 2007. There were 93 deputies present for the vote, and 91 of them voted for Boulkheir; two other deputies, Babah Ould Ahmed Babou and El Arbi Ould Jideyne, each received one vote.

References

Elections in Mauritania
Mauritania
Parliamentary election
November 2006 events in Africa
December 2006 events in Africa
Election and referendum articles with incomplete results